Song Yiling (born 28 January 2001) is a Chinese climber who specializes in speed climbing. She finished second in the speed climbing event at the 2017 and 2018 Asian Climbing Championships. She qualified for the combined event at the 2020 Summer Olympics, where she finished 12th out of 20 competitors.

References

Chinese rock climbers
Living people
2001 births
Sport climbers at the 2020 Summer Olympics
Asian Games medalists in sport climbing
Sport climbers at the 2018 Asian Games
Asian Games bronze medalists for China
Medalists at the 2018 Asian Games
21st-century Chinese women
IFSC Climbing World Cup overall medalists
Speed climbers